Marion Maruska was the defending champion but lost in the first round to Meike Babel.

Dominique Van Roost won in the final 4–6, 7–6, 7–5 against Silvia Farina.

Seeds
A champion seed is indicated in bold text while text in italics indicates the round in which that seed was eliminated.

  Sandrine Testud (semifinals)
  Lisa Raymond (quarterfinals)
  Dominique Van Roost (champion)
  Barbara Schett (first round)
  Sandra Kleinová (first round)
  Silvia Farina (final)
  Tamarine Tanasugarn (quarterfinals)
  Marion Maruska (first round)

Draw

External links
 ITF tournament edition details

WTA Auckland Open
ASB Classic